Araucaria bernieri (Bernier's columnar araucaria) is a species of conifer in the family Araucariaceae.
It is found only in New Caledonia at elevations below 700 meters, mainly in the southern part of the main island. It is a large tree reaching 40–50 meters in height, though specimens growing on poorer soil tend to be dwarfed.
It is threatened by habitat loss with a wild population of less than 10,000 mature trees, and ongoing decline in remaining populations.

References

bernieri
Endemic flora of New Caledonia
Taxonomy articles created by Polbot